Dvoriki is a rural locality in Verkhnelyubazhsky Selsoviet Rural Settlement, Fatezhsky District, Kursk Oblast, Russia. Population:

Geography 
The village is located on the Yasenok River (a right tributary of the Svapa River), 108 km from the Russia–Ukraine border, 64 km north-west of Kursk, 19 km north of the district center – the town Fatezh, 5 km from the selsoviet center – Verkhny Lyubazh.

 Climate
Dvoriki has a warm-summer humid continental climate (Dfb in the Köppen climate classification).

Transport 
Dvoriki is located on the federal route  Crimea Highway (a part of the European route ), 22.5 km from the route  (a part of the European route ), 1 km from the road of intermunicipal significance  (M2 "Crimea Highway" – Yasenok), 26 km from the nearest railway station Kurbakinskaya (railway line Arbuzovo – Luzhki-Orlovskiye).

The rural locality is situated 65 km from Kursk Vostochny Airport, 186 km from Belgorod International Airport and 238 km from Voronezh Peter the Great Airport.

References

Notes

Sources

Rural localities in Fatezhsky District